James Rispoli (born July 19, 1991 in Londonderry, New Hampshire, United States) is an American motorcycle racer. In 2018, he will compete in the British Supersport Championship aboard a Yamaha YZF-R6.

He is also a two-time AMA Supersport Champion, he was champion of the AMA Supersport East Championship in 2011, and also champion of the AMA Supersport West Championship in 2012.

He made his Moto2 world championship debut for Michigan-based team GPTech riding a Tech 3 bike . but was registered by the team as Mistral 610, the real name of the bike, due to the team racing as privateer, he qualified 29th and finished 25th in the race behind the Tech 3 riders Danny Kent and Louis Rossi.

Career statistics

2009- 20th, AMA Pro Supersport East Championship #71    Suzuki GSX-R600
2010- 8th, AMA Pro Supersport East Championship #17    Suzuki GSX-R600
2011- 1st, AMA Pro Supersport East Championship #43    Suzuki GSX-R600
2012- 1st, AMA Pro Supersport West Championship #1    Suzuki GSX-R600
2013- 7th, AMA Pro Daytona SportBike  Championship #43    Suzuki GSX-R600
2014- 9th, British Supersport Championship #43    Suzuki GSX-R600 / Yamaha YZF-R6
2015- 5th, British Supersport Championship #43    Yamaha YZF-R6
2016- 27th, British Superbike Championship #71    Yamaha YZF-R1
2017- 10th, British National Superstock 1000 Championship #43    Kawasaki ZX-10R
2018- British Supersport Championship #43    Yamaha YZF-R6

Grand Prix motorcycle racing

By season

Races by year
(key)

References

1991 births
Living people
American motorcycle racers
Moto2 World Championship riders
People from Londonderry, New Hampshire
AMA Supersport Championship riders
Sportspeople from Rockingham County, New Hampshire